Roxas, officially the Municipality of Roxas,  is a 2nd class municipality in the province of Oriental Mindoro, Philippines. It has a population of 58,849 according to the 2020 census.

History
Founded by Andres Torrefiel on November 15, 1948, it was formerly known as Paclasan, originally a part of Bulalacao, Oriental Mindoro, then a barrio of Mansalay, Oriental Mindoro. It was named after President Manuel A. Roxas, the first town to be named as such.

Marcelo I. Cabrera and Andres E. Torrefiel Sr. who served as mayors of Mansalay. After a meeting held at Mansalay attended by these two leaders with the Congressman of the lone district of the Province of Mindoro, Raul Leuterio, an agreement to separate Paclasan and its sitios from Mansalay as an independent municipality with the seat of government at Paclasan was reached. It was also agreed upon that the newly created municipality be named after the then President of the Republic, Manuel Acuna Roxas. However, it was President Elpidio Quirin, through Executive Order No. 181 dated October 15, 1948 who declared Roxas as an independent town from Mansalay because of the untimely death of President Roxas on April 15, 1948. 
Although Executive Order No. 18, series of 1948 provided that the creation of the municipality of Roxas was to take effect on November 15, 1948, on account of a storm, it was celebrated on November 16, 1948.
On that day, November 16, 1948, a program was held at Paclasan Barrio School with the Bongabon Orchestra playing for the occasion. Speeches were delivered by the then Congressman Raul Leuterio and Governor Conrado Morente. The program was ended by the message of Mr. Andres Estrella Torrefiel Sr. after his appointment and proclamation as Municipal Mayor of the newly created municipality of Roxas, Oriental Mindoro. The program was attended by the barrio lieutenants, the public school teachers, municipal officials and employees and the community people. The name of "PACLASAN BARRIO SCHOOL" was changed to "ROXAS CENTRAL SCHOOL". After the program, a meal was served at the residence of Mayor Andres E. Torrefiel Sr.

First town officials
The appointed officials Mayor Andres E. Torrefiel Sr. and Vice Mayor Florencio G. Taytay Sr., and the municipal councilors Sergio Glori, Maximo Fabila, Isabelo Halili, and Liberato Garfin, served as municipal officials from November 16, 1948, to December 31, 1951. The Municipal Treasurer of Mansalay, Quintin B. Cay, was appointed as Municipal Treasurer for Roxas. The Chief of Police was Nicanor Ladigohon and the Municipal Secretary Treasurer was Ildefonso Tesorero.

Geography
Located  from the main capital city of Calapan, Roxas is the smallest municipality of Oriental Mindoro, with a total land area of 8,526 hectares of up-land, lowland, and coastal areas.

The municipal center of Roxas is situated at approximately 12° 35' North, 121° 31' East, in the island of Mindoro. Elevation at these coordinates is estimated at 10.5 meters or 34.4 feet above mean sea level.

Barangays
Roxas is politically subdivided into 20 barangays.  Barangays Bagumbayan, Cantil, Odiong and Paclasan are considered as urban and the rest as rural areas.

Climate

Demographics

Economy 

In 2003, the Strong Republic Nautical Highway (SNRH) was inaugurated, resulting in the opening of the Port of Roxas, located in Barangay Dangay. The town then became a transit point to Boracay, Romblon (Odiongan and Sibuyan), and Palawan. Several shipping companies such as Starlite and Montenegro Shipping Lines serve this route.

The town is mostly agricultural, with palay, bananas, coconuts, rambutan, lansones, calamansi, and other fruits as primary agricultural crops. Barangays like Cantil, Victoria, Dangay, San Isidro, and Odiong are primarily planted with rice. Barangay Little Tanauan and San Miguel are noted for its fruit orchards and vegetables. Also, some upland barangays like Maraska, San Jose, and San Rafael have developed backyard goat raising.

The Municipal Government of Roxas generated a total income of Php 213 million for CY 2020 from Internal Revenue Allotment (IRA), tax revenue, service and business income and other Income. The largest income of the Municipal Government came from IRA which constitutes 71% of its total revenue.

Operational Banks
The Country Bank
Rural Bank of Pola
Philippine National Bank
Land Bank of the Philippines

Government

Elected officials
Members of the municipal council (2019-2022):
Municipal Mayor: Leo G. Cusi 
Vice Mayor:  Gualberto Magno
Councilors
Jerwin Dimapilis
Agustin Cusi (deceased)
Den Den Dela Cruz 
John John Yason
Robert Quiatchon
Lucille Bacay
Jigs Talens
Ronel S. Sescar

Infrastructure

Transportation
The town is accessible through different modes of transportation. From Calapan, the town can be reached by public utility vans and buses. Roxas is the main port for vessels going to and coming from Caticlan, Malay, Aklan, which is approximately a 4-hour RORO ferry ride from the town. From Caticlan, it is just a short boat ride to the island of Boracay . Bus companies such as RORO Bus Transport, Dimple Star Bus Lines, and Ceres buses also serve the Manila-Roxas route.

Communication
Cellular phone signal from Globe and Smart is relatively strong in the town proper but not in some parts of the municipality. Terrestrial and cable television services are also available through CATSI, Dream Satellite TV, Cignal Digital TV, Tamaraw Vision Network of Calapan, and ROMICOM (a local CATV network). Radio programming is available via 93.3 BRIGADA NEWS FM and the DZRH affiliate 98.9 Hot FM Roxas.

Education

Tertiary schools
Clarendon College
John Paul College
Paradigm Colleges of Science and Technology
Roxas Institute of Science and Technology

Secondary schools
Santo Niño School of Roxas
Marcelo I. Cabrera Vocational National High School
San Mariano National High School
San Mariano Academy
Dangay National High School
Roxas Seventh-Day Adventist Academy
Gelacio I. Yason Foundation-Family Farm School Inc.
John Paul College
San Vicente National High School

References

External links

Roxas Profile at PhilAtlas.com
[ Philippine Standard Geographic Code]
Philippine Census Information
Local Governance Performance Management System
Official Website of Roxas's Mayor

Municipalities of Oriental Mindoro
Port cities and towns in the Philippines
Establishments by Philippine executive order